"Waving the bloody shirt" and "bloody shirt campaign" were pejorative phrases, used during American election campaigns in the 19th century, to deride opposing politicians who made emotional calls to avenge the blood of soldiers that died in the Civil War. The phrases were most often used against Republicans, who were accused of using the memory of the Civil War to their political advantage. Democrats were not above using memories of the Civil War in such a manner as well, especially while campaigning in the South.

Background
The phrases gained popularity with a fictitious incident of April 1871 in which U.S. Representative and former Union general Benjamin Butler of Massachusetts, while making a speech on the floor of the U.S. House of Representatives, supposedly held up a shirt stained with the blood of a Reconstruction Era  carpetbagger who had been whipped by the Ku Klux Klan. Although Butler did give a speech condemning the Klan that month, he never waved anyone's bloody shirt. White Southerners mocked Butler, using the fiction of his having "waved the bloody shirt", to dismiss widespread Klan thuggery and other atrocities, including murder, committed against freed slaves and Republicans. 

The Red Shirts, a defunct 19th-century white supremacist paramilitary organization, took their name from uniforms worn mocking the phrase.

In current usage, the terms are often shortened to bloody shirt and used more broadly to refer to any effort to stir up partisan animosity.

References

External links

Political terminology of the United States
Reconstruction Era